Parliamentary elections were held in Benin on 30 April 2011, after being delayed from 17 April 2011. Turnout was reportedly low. The election saw a six-seat increase for the Cauri Forces for an Emerging Benin, composed of allies of the president Yayi Boni, which took nearly half the parliamentary seats. The election consolidated Boni's victory in the 2011 presidential elections the previous month; Adrien Houngbédji, the second-placed candidate, had rejected the validity of the presidential election results.

Campaign
Around 20 parties and 1,600 candidates contested the elections. The major opposition was formed by a new alliance of parties, Union Makes the Nation, whose leader Houngbédji had run for president in 2006 under the banner of the Democratic Renewal Party.

Results

References

Elections in Benin
Benin
Parliamentary
National Assembly (Benin)